Fard Ibrahim (born 7 January 2000) is a professional Ghanaian football player. He plays in the left-back defender position. His preferred foot is the left.

Professional career
Fard Ibrahim started his professional career in the Ghanaian Premier League team Inter Allies. He played 29 matches for Inter Allies in the Ghana Premier League before he was sent out on loan.

In September 2018, he loaned to the Danish Superliga club Vejle Boldklub. He played 10 matches in the Youth League, five in the Reserve League and in three for the first team.

In January 2019, he joined the Ghana U20 for 2019 Africa U-20 Cup of Nations.

References

2000 births
Living people
Ghanaian footballers
Ghanaian expatriate footballers
Expatriate men's footballers in Denmark
Expatriate footballers in Belarus
Association football fullbacks
Vejle Boldklub players
FC Isloch Minsk Raion players